Eric Kissinger (born August 2, 1986 in Indianapolis, Indiana) is an American Soccer player who currently plays for Dayton Dynamo in the NPSL.

Career
Kissinger attended The Miami Valley School and played 4 years of soccer at Haverford College in Haverford, Pennsylvania, before joining the Dayton Dutch Lions in 2010 for their debut season in the USL Premier Development League in 2010. He played 1 game for the club, and got 10 seconds of playing time before his career-ending injury.

Professional
Kissinger turned professional with the Lions following their self-promotion to the USL Professional Division in 2011. He made his professional debut on April 20, 2011, in 2-0 loss to the Richmond Kickers Now Kissinger proudly teaches the Miami valley school in the dayton area. He finished the 2011 season with 4 goals in 30 games. He currently works as a teacher at The Miami Valley School.

References

External links
 Dayton Dutch Lions profile

1986 births
Living people
American soccer players
Dayton Dutch Lions players
USL League Two players
USL Championship players
Soccer players from Indiana
Association football defenders